Ziaratgah (also Romanized as Zīāratgāh) is a village in Hoseynabad-e Goruh Rural District, Rayen District, Kerman County, Kerman Province, Iran. At the 2006 census, its population was 122, in 30 families.

References 

Populated places in Kerman County